Miss Jamaica Global is a Jamaican beauty pageant for young women in the island, that share the same view as its Motto '''Uniting the World through beauty and tourism.

History
The Miss Global Pageant began in 2004 as Miss Commonwealth, which was created by Franchise Holder Mr. Lachu Ramachandani. However, due to the overwhelming responses from non-commonwealth countries, the director decided to change the title to Miss Global International. Since 2004, he has produced some fabulous queens from all over the World including Canada, Zimbabwe, Bahamas, Jamaica, Trinidad and Tobago, Puerto Rico and the United Kingdom.

Titleholders
The winner of Miss Jamaica Global represents her country in Miss Global International or Miss International

References

External links

 
 
 Instagram:@missglobaljamaica

Jamaica Global
Recurring events established in 2004
Jamaican awards